Tsirege (also Tshirege) is a classic Ancestral Puebloan archaeological site located north of Pajarito Road (now closed to the public) about one mile west of White Rock, New Mexico on property owned by Los Alamos National Laboratory.  Tsirege consists of approximately 800 rooms, was occupied from c. 1325 to c. 1600, and is regarded by the people of San Ildefonso Pueblo as ancestral. The name means "bird place" in the Tewa language. The site includes a long defensive wall, 10 kivas, a reservoir, and many significant petroglyph panels. Tours of the site are rarely offered (twice per decade on average).

See also
Bandelier National Monument
Tsankawi
Puye Cliff Dwellings

References 
 A Plan for the Management of the Cultural Heritage at Los Alamos (large .pdf file)
 North CarolinaSHPO - HPF/Preservation Issues
 Tsirege Pueblo tour

Archaeological sites in New Mexico
Los Alamos National Laboratory
Buildings and structures in Los Alamos County, New Mexico
History of Los Alamos County, New Mexico
Puebloan buildings and structures